The Reial Acadèmia Catalana de Belles Arts de Sant Jordi (in English "Royal Catalan Academy of Fine Arts of Saint George") is a Catalan art school located in Barcelona. The president is the architect Jordi Bonet i Armengol.

The institution was founded as a cost-free school of painting, sculpture and architecture under the former name Escola Gratuïta de Disseny by the Catalan trade council in 1775. In 1849 the school became a member of the provincial academies of arts in Spain (Acadèmies Provincials de Belles Arts), and in 1900 it became autonomous. Today, the ancient school is divided into the faculty of fine arts of the University of Barcelona and the vocational art school, named Escola Superior de Disseny i d’Art Llotja. In 1930 the RACBASJ lost its provincial character and thenceforward it has perceived itself as the Catalan academy of arts. The courses offered include also music and other fine arts.

Selected students

Enric Casanovas i Roy
Emília Coranty Llurià
Llucià Navarro i Rodón
Maties Palau Ferré
Joan Baptista Porcar i Ripollés
Leonci Quera i Tísner
Josep Riera i Aragó

References

External links 

  

Art schools in Spain
Education in Barcelona
Culture in Barcelona
Catalan art
1775 establishments in Spain
Organisations based in Spain with royal patronage